Live at the Comedy Store is the sixth full-length comedy special performed by comedian Louis C.K. It premiered on his website as a $5 download on January 27, 2015 and was later shown on FX. The special was filmed in West Hollywood, California at the Comedy Store by C.K.'s own production company, Pig Newton, Inc.

The special was nominated for two Emmy awards, winning in the Outstanding Writing For A Variety Special category and nominated for Outstanding Variety Special.

C.K. re-released the DVD, video and audio album for download and streaming on his website in April 2020. The special also has been available to stream on Netflix since 2016.

Track listing

Critical reception 
The Daily Dot described the special as "a revolutionary slab of standup...masterful...pops". Paste magazine said, "This is a guy who cherishes every single night he has spent behind a microphone trying to coax laughs from people."

External links

References 

2015 live albums
2015 video albums
2010s comedy albums
Stand-up comedy albums
2015 comedy films
2010s spoken word albums
Films directed by Louis C.K.
Louis C.K. albums
Spoken word albums by American artists
Stand-up comedy concert films